Chun Wo Development Holdings Limited is a Hong Kong-based Asia-Pacific property development and engineering company. The company is a subsidiary of Asia Allied Infrastructure Holdings Limited, a public company listed on the Hong Kong Stock Exchange.

Chun Wo Development was established by Kam-Chun Pang in 1968. The Group started off as a constructor of private sector construction, and later became involved in constructing buildings of various types and functions for the Hong Kong government as well as for private developers.

Major projects

Real estate development 
 Grandeur Terrace, Tin Shui Wai, Hong Kong (2003, jointly developed with Hong Kong Housing Authority)
 Saigon Pearl, Ho Chi Minh City, Vietnam (2009)
 Reem Diamond Residence, Abu Dhabi, United Arab Emirates (2014)
 128 Waterloo, Kowloon, Hong Kong (2022)

Construction project 
 The Westpoint, Sai Ying Pun, Hong Kong (1999)
 The Greenhill Villa, Sha Tin, Hong Kong (2018)
 MTR Kai Tak station, Kai Tak, Hong Kong (2020, a joint venture with Kaden Construction Limited)
 Government Flying Service Kai Tak Division, Kai Tak, Hong Kong (2021)

References

External links 
 

1968 establishments in Hong Kong
Real estate companies established in 1968
Construction and civil engineering companies of Hong Kong
Construction and civil engineering companies established in 1968